Ezra G. Levin is co-chair of the law firm Kramer Levin Naftalis & Frankel LLP, and has been involved in corporate law for more than 40 years as a counselor, teacher and director.  He has been listed in the peer selected The Best Lawyers in America since its inception.

Levin has served on the board of directors of numerous clients including a Fortune 200 company, served as trustee (appointed by the Securities Investor Protection Corporation) of a failed brokerage firm, and has held several judicial appointments as special master. He has taught courses in corporate law, corporate finance, mergers and acquisitions, and securities regulation, and has advised public and private corporations in those areas.

Education
LL.B., Columbia Law School, 1959
A.B., Columbia University, 1955

Other activities
President, Hebrew Free Loan Society of New York
President, Jewish Community Relations Council of Greater New York, 2001–2004

Teaching
Columbia University, Adjunct Associate Professor, 1974–1977; Professor, 1986, 1992
University of Wisconsin Law School, Visiting Professor, Summers 1967 (Corporations) and 1998 (Mergers and Acquisitions)
University of Connecticut Law School, Lecturer, Securities Regulation and Corporate Finance, 1970-1973 *
Russell Sage Foundation, Resident Fellow in Law and the Social Sciences, 1965

Professional Affiliations
American Bar Association, Section of Corporations, Banking and Business Law, 1982–Present
Law and Society Association, 1965–Present

References

External links
Official Biography

Biography
Ezra lives with his wife in The Bronx NYC, he has 2 children and 5 grandchildren who live in Israel and Colorado.

American lawyers
Year of birth missing (living people)
Living people
Columbia Law School alumni
Columbia College (New York) alumni
Columbia Law School faculty
University of Wisconsin Law School faculty
University of Connecticut faculty